NGC 267 is an open cluster in the Small Magellanic Cloud. It is located in the constellation Tucana. It was discovered on October 4, 1836 by John Herschel.

References

External links
 

0267
Open clusters
Small Magellanic Cloud
Tucana (constellation)